The Lucas L-6B (sometimes L6B) is a French homebuilt aircraft that was designed by Émile Lucas. When it was available the aircraft was supplied in the form of plans for amateur construction.

Design and development
The L-6B is a sport touring aircraft derived from the Lucas L6 and Lucas L-6A. It features a cantilever low-wing, a two-seats-in-tandem enclosed cockpit under a bubble canopy, retractable tricycle landing gear and a single engine in tractor configuration.

The aircraft is made from sheet aluminum. The wing is a complex shape with a swept wing root, transitioning to a forward swept leading edge, with a straight tapered trailing edge, resulting in a highly tapered wing planform. The outer wing section can be folded for ground transport or storage. There are optional additional span wing tip extensions to increase glide performance.

The manufacturer estimated the construction time from the supplied kit as 4000 hours.

Operational history
By 1998 the company reported that five kits had been sold and two aircraft were completed and flying.

Specifications (L-6B)

References

L-6B
1990s French sport aircraft
1990s French civil utility aircraft
Single-engined tractor aircraft
Low-wing aircraft
Homebuilt aircraft